Griffiss International Airport  is a public airport located  east of the central business district of Rome, a city in Oneida County, New York, United States. This airport is publicly owned by County of Oneida. It is located on the former site of Griffiss Air Force Base, which closed in 1995. In 1999, the airfield hosted Woodstock '99.

Operations from the Oneida County Airport in Oriskany, New York, were transferred here in 2006, after which the county closed that airport in January 2007.

In December 2013, Griffiss International Airport was selected as a test site by the United States Federal Aviation Administration to "aid in researching the complexities of integrating Unmanned Aircraft Systems into the congested, northeast airspace." Students from the Rochester Institute of Technology will work with Griffiss to test drones at the airport. The airport continued test site operations until 2017.

Griffiss is also a maintenance/storage facility for several regional airlines including Republic Airways, Envoy Airlines, and several more.

Several aircraft are stored here including: 2 Boeing 747-200s, 1 Boeing 767-200, and 1 Boeing 777-200.

Facilities
 Runway 15/33: 11,820 x 200 ft (3,603 x 61 m), Surface: Concrete

For 12-month period ending September 13, 2005 the airport had 1,000 aircraft operations:
 85% general aviation: 850
 15% military: 150

Future 
With the construction of a new terminal building in 2015, public officials hoped to secure additional investment in the facility to attract passenger airlines. The new terminal building also allows for international flights to the airport, as it was constructed to accommodate a US Customs Service-regulation facility for potential international passengers.

References

External links

Airports in New York (state)
Transportation buildings and structures in Oneida County, New York
Transportation in Rome, New York